Australia vs Papua New Guinea in rugby league is a rivalry between the Australia national rugby league team and the Papua New Guinea national rugby league team in the sport of rugby league. The first match between the two sides was in 1982, with the Kangaroos coming out with a 38–2 victory. They have played each other ten times, with Australia winning each match-up by at least 22 points.

The Home and Away labels are technical terms, and may not reflect the actual home team in the match (e.g. 2008 World Cup).

Head to Head

Results

2010s

2000s

1990s

1980s

References

External links 

 Australia vs Papua New Guinea – Rugby League Project

Rugby league rivalries
Australia national rugby league team
Papua New Guinea national rugby league team
Sports rivalries in Australia